The Weightlifting at the 1973 Southeast Asian Peninsular Games was held between 2 to 5 September.

Medal summary

Men

Medal table

Sources
 Yesterday's results
 Yesterday's Seap results

Weightlifting at the Southeast Asian Games